Luise Walker (9 September 1910 – 30 January 1998) was an Austrian classical guitarist and guitar composer – one of the most prominent female guitarists of her time.

Life and career
Walker was born in Vienna and began studying guitar at the age of eight. Initially a student of Josef Zuth, she subsequently studied at the University of Music and Performing Arts, Vienna, with Jakob Ortner. She also took lessons with Heinrich Albert, Miguel Llobet, both of whom were frequent guests at her parents home, also with Andrés Segovia and Emilio Pujol.

From 1940, she devoted her life to the guitar. She gave concerts internationally, touring through many parts of Europe, Russia and the United States. For many years she taught guitar alongside Karl Scheit at the University of Music and Performing Arts. She was also a respected composer for the guitar, writing studies, solos and transcriptions.

Writings
Ein Leben mit der Gitarre (Frankfurt: Zimmermann, 1989); .

References

1910 births
1998 deaths
20th-century guitarists
Austrian classical composers
Austrian classical guitarists
Composers for the classical guitar
Women classical guitarists
20th-century women guitarists